Northern League may refer to:

Sport
Baseball
 Northern League (baseball, 1902–71), a name used by several minor leagues that operated in the upper midwestern U.S. and Manitoba from 1902 to 1971
 Northern League (baseball, 1993–2010), an independent baseball league in the United States from 1993 to 2010
 Northern League (1936–1952), a collegiate summer baseball league that operated primarily in New York and Vermont
 Northern Association (1910), a minor league in Illinois and Iowa that operated for only one season
 Northern League (collegiate summer baseball), a collegiate summer baseball league named the Midwest Collegiate League from 2010 to 2022

Cricket
 Northern Premier Cricket League, a cricket league in England

Football
 Northern Football League, also known as Ebac Northern League, an association football league in North East England
 Northern Football League (Scotland) A now defunct Scottish football competition, in existence between 1891 and 1920
 Northern League (New Zealand), an association football league covering the northern part of the North Island, New Zealand
 Northern Premier League, also known as EvoStik League and previously UniBond League, an association football league covering the whole of the north of England
 Northern League, the first association football league in Italy

Ice hockey
 Northern League (ice hockey, 1966–1982), existed in the late 1970s and early 1980s in the United Kingdom
 Northern League (ice hockey, 2005–), a current minor ice hockey league in the United Kingdom

Motorcycle speedway
 Northern League (speedway), one of two British speedway leagues between 1929 and 1931

Other meanings
 Northern League (Lega Nord), a political party in Italy
 Northern League (United Kingdom), a eugenics group active in the United Kingdom in the mid-20th century